"Family Reunion" is a song by the American rock band Blink-182. The song, which lasts only 36 seconds, is essentially a sung-through version of comedian George Carlin's seven dirty words routine: shit, piss, fuck, cunt, cocksucker, motherfucker, and tits, with the addition of fart, turd, and twat (words which Carlin had also mentioned in follow ups to the routine). Recorded in 1999, it was distributed as a promotional single for the band's third album, Enema of the State.

Background
"Family Reunion" originated during the band's live concerts, where they created the song while joking around. A studio version was recorded at the behest of NOFX frontman Fat Mike, and it was included on Short Music for Short People, a 1999 Fat Wreck Chords compilation, featuring 101 short 30-second songs. The studio version was produced and mixed by Jerry Finn. The song was also released on a promotional CD given for free to radio programmers and record stores promoting the release of the band's third album, Enema of the State (1999).

The song continues to serve as an epilogue of sorts following each concert's conclusion to this day. Numerous live recordings exist, most notably on the band's sole live album, The Mark, Tom and Travis Show (The Enema Strikes Back!) (2000). In 2015, Rolling Stone contributor Andy Greene named it the band's "single most juvenile song."

Notes

External links

Blink-182 songs
1999 songs
Comedy rock songs
Songs written by Mark Hoppus
Songs written by Tom DeLonge